George Preti (October 7, 1944 – March 3, 2020) was an analytical organic chemist who worked at the Monell Chemical Senses Center in Philadelphia, Pennsylvania. For more than four decades, his research focused on the nature, origin, and functional significance of human odors. Dr. Preti's laboratory has identified characteristic underarm odorants, and his later studies centered upon a bioassay-guided approach to the identification of human pheromones, odors diagnostic of human disease, human malodor identification and suppression and examining the “odor-print” of humans.

Early life and education
Preti was born and raised in Brooklyn, New York.  He received his B.S. in chemistry from the Polytechnic Institute of Brooklyn in 1966. He earned a  Ph.D. in organic chemistry in 1971 from the Massachusetts Institute of Technology, with a specialty in organic mass spectrometry in the laboratory of Professor Klaus Biemann. That same year he joined the Monell Center.

Career
Preti was also an adjunct professor in the Department of Dermatology of the University of Pennsylvania School of Medicine.

Research
In addition to having published dozens of peer-reviewed research articles, Preti held more than a dozen patents related to deodorance, odor mediated control of the menstrual cycle, and the use of odors in disease diagnosis. His unique area of research resulted in hundreds of clinician-directed referrals of patients with an idiopathic body and oral malodor production problems. His efforts in this area revealed a large, undiagnosed population of people suffering from trimethylaminuria, an odor-producing genetic disorder.

Preti’s work has frequently been cited by the news media, including The New York Times magazine section, The Philadelphia Inquirer, and ABC’s “Primetime: Medical Mysteries”.

Publications

Death
He died on March 3, 2020, of bladder cancer in Hatboro, Pennsylvania.

References

External links
Dr. George Preti's homepage at Monell.org

1944 births
2020 deaths
Polytechnic Institute of New York University alumni
21st-century American chemists
Organic chemists
Massachusetts Institute of Technology School of Science alumni